Valerie Mason-John (born 22 November 1962) is the co-founder of Eight Step Recovery - Using The Buddha's Teaching to Overcome Addiction, an alternative to the 12-step programs for addiction.

Thesis
Since the publication of the book by Windhorse Publications in 2013, it has been the recipient of a Best USA Book Award 2014 and Best International Book Award 2015 in the self-motivational and self-help category. Eight Step Meetings now take place in the UK, USA, Canada, India and Finland. Mason-John is also the co-creator of Mindfulness Based Addiction Recovery (MBAR), which was inspired by Mindfulness Based Cognitive Therapy for Depression by John D. Teasdale, Mark Williams, and Zindal Seagal. They are the author of eight books and work as a public speaker in Mindfulness for Addiction and Emotional Well Being, and are a trainer in anti-bullying and conflict resolution. Valerie is ordained in the Triratna Buddhist Community, where they received their spiritual name, Vimalasara. They are also the chairperson of Triratna Vancouver Buddhist Centre. Their Buddhist name is Vimalasara, which means "she whose essence is stainless and pure". They used to be a freelance feature writer for The Voice newspaper and were also a performer and spoken-word poet using the stage name "Queenie". Black British by birth, they have now become a Canadian.

Biography
Born in Cambridge, England to Sierra Leone Creole parents, Mason-John spent their childhood "in care" — in foster homes and childcare facilities, including the Barnardo's Orphanages in Britain with the exception of a short time spent living with their mother in their early teens. They dropped out before receiving their undergraduate degree in the 1980s, but has continued to pursue post-graduate education and training into the present. Since the early 1990s, they has worked as a writer, performing artist and lecturer. They received a teaching certificate from South Bank University, and currently conducts seminars in anger management and conflict resolution.

After 18 months of studying philosophy and politics at Leeds University during the 1980s, Mason-John studied post-graduate journalism, earned an MFA in creative writing and diploma in theatrical performance at Sussex University and The Desmond Jones School. By 2003, their interest in counseling and their ordination into the Western Buddhist Order led them into writing and performing, and on training themselves and others in anger management and conflict resolution. In December 2007, Mason-John was named Honorary Doctor of Letters by The University of East London. Mason John continues to write, work as a self-awareness trainer; they perform and lecture internationally.

Mason-John uses they/them pronouns and is a member of the LGBT community.

Publication, broadcasting, and academic work
Mason-John's work has appeared in UK and international journalistic and scholarly publications such as The Guardian, The Voice, Curve Magazine, The Morning Star, Pink Paper, Girl Friend Magazine and Wasafiri. They have also contributed to Half the Earth: Women's Experience of Travel Worldwide (second edition, Pandora Rough Guide, 1990), Frauen Zimmerim Haus Europa (Papyrosa, 1991), Assaults on Convention (Cassell, 1995), Words from Word Up Café (Centerprise Publications, 1993), and Tell Tales (Tell Tales/Flipped Eye Publications, 2005).

Mason-John was the editor of Feminist Arts News from 1992 to 1997. Additionally, they were the artistic director of the London Mardi Gras from 1997 to 2000, and spent four years as the director of the Pride Arts Festival. Their television credits include freelance work for the BBC, Channel 4 and Vis International TV; they have also been featured on British radio broadcasts for the BBC World Service and the regional programmes Midweek, Woman's Hour and The Shelagh Rogers Show Next Chapter on CBC Radio.

In addition to their work in broadcasting and journalism, Mason-John embarked on a career in theatre. Having studied at the Desmond Jones School of Mime and Physical Theatre, they began performing and writing for the stage by 1998. Focusing on one-woman plays, they developed a body of work including Sin Dykes, Brown Girl in the Ring, The Adventures of Snow Black and Rose Red and You Got Me among other plays.

Their first novel Borrowed Body (2005), which was later relaunched as The Banana Kid (2007), received the Mind Book of the Year Award. Since, Mason-John has authored six books including their spiritual non-fiction Detox Your Heart (2006), which is slated for revision in 2017.

The Great Black North 
In 2012, Mason-John alongside spoken-word artist Kevan Anthony Cameron co-edited the anthology The Great Black North: Contemporary African Canadian Poetry, published by Frontenac House, featuring more than 90 poets. The Great Black North was one of the first complete poetry collections of contemporary Black Canadian poets. Notable poets in the anthology include George Elliot Clarke, M. Nourbese Philip, Wayde Compton, Sylvia Hamilton, Olive Senior, Fredrick Ward and d'bi Young. The anthology is unique in the way it categorizes "page" and "stage" poetry, as a means to honour both the written and oral traditions of poets from the African Diaspora.

Published works
 1992–97: Editor of Feminist Arts News
 1992: Black Art and Culture on the Mainland of Europe: France, Belgium, Germany, Netherlands, Spain (editor), Arts Council of England
 1993: Lesbians Talk: Making Black Waves (co-author with Ann Khambatta) Scarlet Press, 
 1993: Words from the Women's Cafe: Lesbian Poetry from Word Up (contributor; eds Bernadette Halpin and Dorothea Smartt), Centerprise Publications, 
 1994: Talking Black: Lesbians of African and Asian Descent Speak Out Anthology (editor), Cassell, 
 1995: Assaults on Convention (contributor), Cassell, 
 1999: Brown Girl in the Ring: Plays, Prose and Poems, Get A Grip
 2005: Borrowed Body, Serpent's Tail,  
 2005: Tell Tales (contributor), Tell Tales/Flipped Eye Publication, 
 2006: Detox Your Heart, Windhorse Publications, 
 2007: Black British Aesthetic, edited by Victoria Arana – contributor, 
 2008: Broken Voices Ex Untouchable Women Speak Out, 
 2012: The Great Black North - Contemporary African Canadian Poetry (edited with Kevan Anthony Cameron), 
 2013: New edition of Borrowed Body, Demeter Press Canada, 
 2014: Eight Step Recovery - Using The Buddha's Teachings to Overcome Addiction - co author, 
 2017: New revised expanded edition of Detox Your Heart - Meditations for Emotional Trauma, 
 2020: I Am Still Your Negro: An Homage to James Baldwin. Canada: University of Alberta Press,

Prizes and awards
 2015 The Best International Book Award (for Eight Step Recovery)
 2014 The Best USA Book Award (for Eight Step Recovery)
 2014 The Robert Kroetsch Poetry Award (for The Great Black North)
 2014 Alberta's Book Awards  Best Educational Book (for The Great Black North)
 2007 Honorary Doctorate for Life time Achievements - Doctor of Letters
 2007 Black LGBT Community Award
 2006/7 Grant For The Arts – Arts Council England
 2006 Winner Mind Book of The Year Award (for Borrowed Body)
 2005 Young Minds Book Award (shortlist) (for Borrowed Body)
 2001 Winner of the Black, Asian and Chinese Shoreline/Cultureword First Chapter Award
 2000 Windrush Achievement Award Arts and Community Pioneer

References

External links

Eight Step Recovery: Using the Buddha's Teachings to Overcome Addictions
Let's Talk About Bullying
Using the Buddha’s Teachings to Overcome Addiction, a Dharma Talk for Tricycle: The Buddhist Review. April 2016. 
https://web.archive.org/web/20070203150716/http://www.contemporarywriters.com/authors/?p=auth5688A7141b5e91959BLwX4224A05
"Valerie Mason-John inspires graduates - awarded Honorary Doctorate of the University of East London", University of East London, 2006.
"Hoping With Compassion". Interview by Biswadip Mitra, Insight, 28 February 2008.
"Entertainment : Books : Interviews | Valerie Mason-John", GaydarNation, 3 July 2005.
Rochita Loenen-Ruiz, "Inside the Writing Mind - An Interview with Valerie Mason-John", The Sword Review, 2005.
Linda Jordan, "'Detox Your Heart' by Valerie Mason-John", Wildmind, 18 April 2007.
"Valerie Mason-John (Vimalasara)", Windhorse Publications
I Am Still Your Negro

Living people
1962 births
20th-century British women writers
21st-century British women writers
Black British women writers
Black Canadian writers
British self-help writers
English Buddhists
Canadian lesbian writers
LGBT Black British people
English LGBT people
People from Cambridge
People of Sierra Leone Creole descent
Sierra Leone Creole people
British lesbian writers
21st-century British LGBT people
21st-century Canadian LGBT people